Henri de la Tour can refer to:

Henri de la Tour-du-Pin (1296–1349), bishop of Metz
Henri du Tour (c. 1540-1580), French name of Hendrik van den Keere
Henri de La Tour d'Auvergne, Duke of Bouillon (1555–1623), French nobleman
Henri de la Tour d'Auvergne, Vicomte de Turenne (1611–1675), Marshal of France
Louis Henri de La Tour d'Auvergne (1679–1753), French nobleman
Henri, prince de La Tour d'Auvergne (1823–1871), French politician,  Minister of Foreign Affairs for Napoleon III